Nicole Dawn Livingstone, OAM (born 24 June 1971) is an Australian former competitive swimmer. Since retiring from swimming Livingstone has had careers as a television sports commentator and media presenter and as a sports administrator. She was known for a period as Nicole Stevenson, when she was married to Australian cyclist Clayton Stevenson.

Early life
Livingstone grew up in Melbourne and started swimming at 9. She attended Parkdale Secondary College.

Her mother worked at Metropolitan Golf Club and her father at Carlton & United Breweries.

She had an older brother, Gary and older sister, Karen.

Swimming career
Livingstone competed for Australia in three summer Olympics - 1988, 1992, and 1996 - winning both individual and team medals. She was an Australian Institute of Sport scholarship holder.

She held the Australian record for the 200-metre backstroke, with at time of 2:10.20, set on 31 July 1992 at the 1992 Summer Olympics in Barcelona, Spain for 16 years. Meagen Nay broke the Australian record twice at the 2008 Australian Olympic Trials. She is the only Australian swimmer to have competed in six successive Pan Pacific Swimming Championships. Livingston’s coaches included Bill Nelson at Melbourne Vicentre and Gennadi Touretski.

Notable races 
 1991 World Aquatics Championships (Perth), 4x100 medley relay, 2nd place Australia (with Linley Frame, Susie O'Neill, Karen Van Wirdum)
 1992, 200 m backstroke, set world short course record, Melbourne.
 1992 Summer Olympics, 200 m backstroke, Bronze medal.
 1996 Summer Olympics, 4 × 200 m freestyle relay, Bronze medal (with Julia Greville, Emma Johnson, Susan O'Neill)
 1996 Summer Olympics, 4 × 100 m medley relay, Silver medal (with Samantha Riley, Susan O'Neill, Sarah Ryan)

Media career
Upon retiring from swimming following the 1996 Olympics, Livingstone began commentating on the surf lifesaving and swimming on the Nine Network.

While at Nine she also had the role of host of Nine's Wide World of Sport, Sports Saturday and Any Given Sunday with Mick Molloy in 2006.

When the swimming coverage moved to Network 10 in 2009, Livingstone moved stations.

In 2017 Livingstone co-hosted Sideliners with Tegan Higginbotham on the ABC which was looking to put a female lens on sport.

Livingstone has also been a sports presenter on Nine News PM Edition and a fill in presenter on Network Ten's Sports Tonight.

Since her retirement, Livingstone has travelled to all six Summer Olympics and at the Commonwealth Games as a commentator for the swimming coverage.

Nicole has worked for Amazon Prime Video in 2021 and 2022 commentating on the Australian Swimming Championships.

She has also been a presenter for Melbourne station SEN 1116 and appeared on a number of programs including The Project and Q+A.

Business and administrative roles

Sporting roles 
Livingstone has worked on multiple boards for various sporting bodiesLivingstone is active in promoting drug-free sports in Australia and is involved in the Australian Olympic Committee's "Live Clean, Play Clean" anti-doping education program. She was also a board member of the Australian Sports Drug Agency (ASDA), whose mission is to combat drug use in sports.

Livingstone was elected to the board of the Australian Olympic Committee in 2013. While Roche's campaign was ultimately unsuccessful, Livingstone was the only member of the rival ticket to be elected.

Livingstone sits on the Board of Swimming Australia and has been the Chief Executive of the Melbourne Vicentre Swimming Club since July 2012 until the 2016 Summer Olympics.

Livingstone was announced as the Australian Football League's head of women's football on 16 November 2017. At this time she resigned her post on the executive of the AOC. She is responsible for managing the AFL Women's competition.

In addition to these roles, she has also sat on the board of the Victorian Olympic Council.

Other roles 
At the time of her appointment to the board of Swimming Australia, Livingstone was also a member of the VicHealth and State Sports Centre Trust boards.

Following her mother's death from ovarian cancer, Livingstone started Ovarian Cancer Australia and is currently the patron of the organisation.

Personal life 
Livingstone was married to cyclist Clayton Stevenson, and is currently married to cinematographer Marty Smith.

She has three children, twins Ella and Joshua in 2002, and a second son, Robinson in 2007.

Her mother died from ovarian cancer, and both Stevenson and her sister have both tested positive for the BRCA2 gene. They have both had surgery to remove their ovaries.

Her father died of prostate cancer in 2014.

Honours
Livingstone was awarded the Order of Australia Medal in 1997 for service to swimming as a representative at state, national and international levels.

A Sydney RiverCat ferry was named after Livingstone in 1995.

She was a finalist for Veuve Clicquot BOLD Woman award in 2021.

See also 
 List of Olympic medalists in swimming (women)
 List of Commonwealth Games medallists in swimming (women)

References

External links 
 Australian Institute of Sports: Swimming
 Australian Sports Drug Agency: 
 

1971 births
Living people
Olympic swimmers of Australia
Swimmers at the 1988 Summer Olympics
Swimmers at the 1992 Summer Olympics
Swimmers at the 1996 Summer Olympics
Swimming commentators
Recipients of the Medal of the Order of Australia
Swimmers at the 1986 Commonwealth Games
Swimmers at the 1990 Commonwealth Games
Swimmers at the 1994 Commonwealth Games
Commonwealth Games gold medallists for Australia
Commonwealth Games silver medallists for Australia
Commonwealth Games bronze medallists for Australia
Sportswomen from Victoria (Australia)
Olympic silver medalists for Australia
Olympic bronze medalists for Australia
Olympic bronze medalists in swimming
Australian female backstroke swimmers
Australian female freestyle swimmers
Australian Institute of Sport swimmers
Medalists at the FINA World Swimming Championships (25 m)
Swimmers from Melbourne
World Aquatics Championships medalists in swimming
Medalists at the 1996 Summer Olympics
Medalists at the 1992 Summer Olympics
Olympic silver medalists in swimming
Commonwealth Games medallists in swimming
Australian sports executives and administrators
VFL/AFL administrators
Medallists at the 1986 Commonwealth Games
Medallists at the 1990 Commonwealth Games
Medallists at the 1994 Commonwealth Games